Anaan is a 2017 Indian Marathi-language film produced by Raunaq Bhatia & Hemant Bhatia under the banner of Rohan Theatres Pvt. Ltd. It is being directed by Rajesh Kushte. The film stars Prarthana Behere along with Omkar Shinde, Sukhada Khandkekar, Suyog Gorhe, Uday Nene, Shilpa Tulaskar, Yatin Karyekar, Prajakta Mali, Uday Sabnis, Veena Jagtap, Rajendra Shisatkar, Sneha Raikar, Akshata Tikhe and Bhumi Dali.

Cast
 Omkar Shinde as Yuvraj 
 Prarthana Behere as Neel
 Sukhada Khandkekar as Kris
 Yatin Karyekar
 Shilpa Tulaskar
 Uday Sabnis
 Veena Jagtap
 Rajendra Shisatkar
 Sneha Raikar
 Prajakta Mali
 Uday Nene
 Suyog Gorhe
 Akshata Tikhe
 Bhumi Dali

Production
Raunaq Bhatia and Hemant Bhatia produced this movie, co-produced by Kailash Chumbhale, Shivkumar Sharma, Radheya Malpani. Story by Hemant Bhatia, Screenplay & Dialogues by Rajesh Kushte and Mukesh Jadhav, DOP is Raj Kadur, Editing by Sejal Painter. Music is given by Saurabh Shetye and Durgesh Khot, and songs sung by Sonu Nigam, Aanandi Joshi, Ravindra Sathe, Pooja Gaitonde and Saurabh Shetye.

Soundtrack

References

External links
 

2010s Marathi-language films